The 1971 Texas A&M Aggies football team represented Texas A&M University in the 1971 NCAA University Division football season as a member of the Southwest Conference (SWC). The Aggies were led by head coach Gene Stallings in his seventh season and finished with a record of five wins and six losses (5–6 overall, 4–3 in the SWC).

Stallings was fired as head coach and athletic director at the conclusion of the season and replaced by Emory Bellard, offensive coordinator of archrival Texas and the architect of the Wishbone formation. Stallings was hired by Tom Landry to be an assistant coach with the National Football League's Dallas Cowboys, a position he held until he was named head coach of the St. Louis Cardinals in 1986. Stallings returned to college coaching in 1990 as head coach at Alabama.

Schedule

References

Texas AandM
Texas A&M Aggies football seasons
Texas AandM Aggies football